is the 16th studio album by Japanese singer/songwriter Mari Hamada, released on March 27, 2002. Produced by Hamada and Hiroyuki Ohtsuki, it was Hamada's first release by Tri-M/MidZet House. Instead of having guest musicians, Ohtsuki handled all of the instruments during the recording. The album was reissued alongside Hamada's past releases on January 15, 2014.

Marigold peaked at No. 97 on Oricon's albums chart.

Track listing
All lyrics are written by Mari Hamada; all music is composed by Hiroyuki Ohtsuki, except where indicated; all music is arranged by Hiroyuki Ohtsuki and Mari Hamada, except where indicated.

Charts

References

External links 
  (Mari Hamada)
 Official website (Tokuma Japan)
 
 

2002 albums
Japanese-language albums
Mari Hamada albums
Tokuma Shoten albums